Abdelghani Zitouni (May 5, 1932 – November 17, 2010) was an Algerian international football player and manager. Zitouni scored the first ever goal in the history of the Algeria national team.

Club career
Zitouni spent the majority of his playing career with OMR El Annasser, after starting off with RC Kouba. He also played briefly with MC Alger 1953-1954  CR Belouizdad.

International career
On January 6, 1963, Zitouni made his debut for the Algerian National Team in a 2-1 win over Bulgaria in a friendly at the Stade 20 Août in Algiers. In that game, he scored a goal in the 72nd minute, which was also the first goal in the history of independent Algeria.

On June 17, 1965, Zitouni got his last cap for Algeria, in a 3-0 loss against Brazil in Oran.

Managerial career
After his playing career, Zitouni managed a number of Algerian clubs, most notably USM Alger in the 1970s.

References

1932 births
2010 deaths
Footballers from Algiers
Algerian footballers
Algerian football managers
Algeria international footballers
CR Belouizdad players
RC Kouba players
MC Alger players
OMR El Annasser players
USM Alger managers
Association football midfielders
21st-century Algerian people